Purinton is a surname. Notable people with the surname include:

 Adam Purinton, murderer
Dale Purinton (born 1976), American hockey coach
Edward Earle Purinton (1878–1943), American businessman, naturopath, philosopher, and self-help writer
 Richmond Purinton, partner of diarist Donald Vining
Royce Purinton (1877–1919), American football player